The Argument is the fourth and final solo studio album from Grant Hart, formerly of the band Hüsker Dü. The album was released in 2013, four years before Hart's death. It is a concept album based on John Milton's Paradise Lost, and inspired by Hart's friendship with renowned beat author William S. Burroughs. The album features guitar, keyboards, mallet instruments, and found sounds.  It was released to universal critical acclaim.

Track listing
All songs written by Grant Hart, except "Out of Chaos" by Grant Hart and John Milton.

Personnel
 Grant Hart – vocals, instruments, production
 Davin Odegaard – bass
 Peter Susag – upright bass on track 11
 Aron Woods – drums on track 11
 Mike Wisti – production
 Andrew Moxom – photography
 Rob Carmichael – design

Notes

2013 albums
Grant Hart albums
Domino Recording Company albums